Party lists for the 2019 Israeli legislative election may refer to:
 Party lists for the April 2019 Israeli legislative election
 Party lists for the September 2019 Israeli legislative election